Czechia is the official short form name of the Czech Republic.

Czechia may also refer to:

 Historical Czech lands
Czechoslovakia (1918–1993)
Czech Socialist Republic (1969–1990)
Protectorate of Bohemia and Moravia (1939–1945)

See also
Bohemia, the largest part of the Czech Republic; its name is similar to "Czechia" in many languages, and may occasionally be called so in translations into English
Czech Republic (disambiguation)
Czech (disambiguation)
Czechoslovak (disambiguation)
Name of the Czech Republic